Temple Mill Island is an island in the River Thames in England upstream of Marlow, and just downstream of Temple Lock. It is on the southern Berkshire bank close to Hurley.

The island is named after the three watermills that used to be on the island for beating copper and brass.  The island now has a modern housing development on it with a marina.

Daniel Defoe referred to the mills in his A tour thro' the Whole Island of Great Britain (1724-1727). He referred to the "three very remarkable mills, called Temple-Mills, for making Bisham Abbey Battery-work viz. Brass Kettles and Pans &c of all sorts. And these works were attended with no small success, till in the year 1720, they made a bubble of it; and then it ran the fate of all the Bubbles at that time".

See also
Islands in the River Thames

References

Islands of Berkshire
Islands of the River Thames
Watermills on the River Thames
Watermills in Berkshire
Bisham